A sequence determination is a type of examination conducted by a forensic document examiner.  This type of forensic examination is done in an attempt to determine which of two events occurred first in the preparation of a document.  Another term used for this type of examination is "sequence of intersections" since the evaluation requires intersection of physical materials on the document.

Types
 Sequence of Strokes: term for examinations involving two or more writing strokes from one or more writing instruments
 Sequence determinations for writing ink with other types of material:
Ballpoint pen ink/toner sequence
Ballpoint pen ink/inkjet ink sequence
Writing instrument/paper fold sequence
Writing instrument/typewriting sequence
 Other sequence determinations:
Toner/paper fold sequence

Methods
The primary means of evaluation involves direct visual examination using microscopy and various lighting options.  The intersection point may involve subtle deviations from the normal manner of deposition or production that can be observed on microscopic examination (e.g. extraneous ink deposits, skipping, misalignments, embossing, etc.).  The lifting/casting technique (see below) has also been tested with some success.  Intersections involving indentations may also be assessed using an electrostatic detection device to visualize latent indentations.

Binocular optical microscopy
Scanning electron microscopy
Atomic force microscopy
Lifting techniques
Kromekote paper method
Mikrosil casting method
Electrostatic detection device (EDD) method

Significance
The underlying concept is that each of the sequences will produce a distinctive result that can be visualized or measured.

In some instances, the results will be essentially conclusive with only one reasonable interpretation.  In other situations, the results may be less definite in that the observed features may permit more than one interpretation of the original sequence.

References

Forensic techniques
Questioned document examination